The women's javelin throw event at the 2013 Summer Universiade was held on 9 July.

Results

References 
Results

Javelin
2013 in women's athletics
2013